The classical TV series Young Person's Guide to the Orchestra was created by world-renowned orchestra conductor Leonard Bernstein, in 1960. Bernstein created the show for the purpose of exposing young viewers, mainly school-aged children, not just to European classical music, but to various kinds of orchestral instruments as well. It was a weekly show on CBS, and then PBS picked up the show in 1972.

1970s American children's television series
Classical music television series